Brevioleria is a genus of clearwing (ithomiine) butterflies, named by Lamas in 2004. They are in the brush-footed butterfly family, Nymphalidae.

Species
Arranged alphabetically:
Brevioleria aelia (Hewitson, 1852)
Brevioleria arzalia (Hewitson, 1876)
Brevioleria coenina (Hewitson, 1869)
Brevioleria seba (Hewitson, 1872)

References 

Ithomiini
Nymphalidae of South America
Nymphalidae genera